Judith Mary Bailey  (born 3 October 1935) is a New Zealand-born pianist, jazz musician and composer who has lived in Australia since 1960.

Music career
Bailey was born in Auckland and raised in Whangarei, a town in the north of New Zealand. As a young child she learned ballet, followed by piano and theory when she was 10 years old. She graduated from Trinity College London when she was 16.

Bailey moved to Australia in 1960, spending most of her time in Sydney. She has performed on TV, music venues such as the El Rocco and on many recordings.

Bailey is a senior lecturer in jazz composition and jazz piano at the Sydney Conservatorium of Music of which she commenced in 1973 and is also musical director of the Sydney Youth Jazz Ensemble (Jazz Connection).

In 1973, Bailey became the pianist on the Australian Broadcasting Corporation children's radio show Kindergarten, which often featured presenters from Play School, notably Barbara Frawley, Alister Smart, Don Spencer and Geoff Ayling.

In 2017, rapper Rick Ross with producer Bink sampled Bailey's "Colour of My Dreams" from the Judy Bailey Quartet album Colours. The sample was used on Ross' track "Santorini Greece" on the album Rather You Than Me.

Bailey is a represented artist of the Australian Music Centre.

Discography

Albums
{| class="wikitable plainrowheaders" style="text-align:center;" border="1"
|+ List of albums, with selected details
! Title
! Details
|-
! scope="row" | The Wind  (The Errol Buddle Quartet featuring Judy Bailey)
|
 Released: 1962
 Format: LP
 Label: His Master's Voice (OCLP 7594)
|-
! scope="row" | You & The Night & The Music
|
 Released: 1964
 Format: LP
 Label: CBS (BP233126)
|-
! scope="row" | My Favourite Things
|
 Released: 1965
 Format: LP
 Label: CBS (BP233263)
|-
! scope="row" | One Moment
|
 Released: 1973
 Format: LP
|-
! scope="row" | Colours
|
 Released: 1976
 Format: LP
|-
! scope="row" | Solo
|
 Released: 1978
 Format: LP
 Label: Eureka (E-107)
|-
! scope="row" | Notwithstanding
|
 Released: 1992
 Format: CD
|-
! scope="row" | Sundial
|
 Released: 1993
 Format: CD
|-
! scope="row" | The Spritely Ones
|
 Released: September 2001
 Format: CD
 Label: Tall Poppies (TP159)
|-
! scope="row" | Speakeasy'
|
 Released: 2001
 Format: CD
 Label: Judy Bailey 
|-
! scope="row" | Jazz Legends: Judy Bailey|
 Released: 2011
 Format: 4×CD
 Label: ABC Jazz (476 4515)
|-
! scope="row" | Another Journey|
 Released: August 2018
 Format: 2×CD, digital
 Label: Sydney Conservatorium Of Music 
|}

Awards and honours
2004: Order of Australia Medal for services to Music and Education.
 2008: Award for Distinguished Services to Australian Music at the Annual Classical Music Awards.
 2017: Awarded an Honorary Doctorate from the University of Sydney 
 2022: Australia Council Don Banks Music Award

ARIA Music Awards
The ARIA Music Awards are an annual awards ceremony which recognises excellence, innovation and achievement across all genres of Australian music. They commenced in 1987. 

! 
|-
| 1993
| Notwithstanding|rowspan="2"| Best Jazz Album
| 
|rowspan="2"| 
|-
| 1994
| Sundial''
| 
|-

Sir Bernard Heinze Memorial Award
The Sir Bernard Heinze Memorial Award is given to a person who has made an outstanding contribution to music in Australia.

! 
|-
| 2018 || Judy Bailey|| Sir Bernard Heinze Memorial Award ||  || 
|-

Australian Jazz Bell Awards
The Australian Jazz Bell Awards, also known as the Bell Awards or The Bells, are annual music awards for the jazz music genre in Australia.
 (wins only)
|-
| 2014
| Judy Bailey
| Hall of Fame
| 
|-

Mo Awards
The Australian Entertainment Mo Awards (commonly known informally as the Mo Awards) were annual Australian entertainment industry awards. They recognised achievements in live entertainment in Australia from 1975 to 2016. Bailey won one award in that time.
 (wins only)
|-
| 1991
| Judy Bailey
| Jazz Performer of the Year (Female)
| 
|-

References

External links
Official website

Living people
1935 births
20th-century New Zealand musicians
Academic staff of the Sydney Conservatorium of Music
Recipients of the Medal of the Order of Australia
Women jazz pianists
Musicians from Auckland
New Zealand emigrants to Australia
20th-century Australian musicians
21st-century pianists
Women music educators
Australian women composers
Australian jazz composers
Women jazz composers
20th-century women pianists
21st-century women pianists